This is a list of Allied forces in the Normandy campaign between 6 June and 25 August 1944. Primary combat units are listed here; unit articles may contain a complete order of battle.

United States

United Kingdom
See also Hastings  Overlord: D-Day and the Battle for Normandy

Independent and GHQ brigades included 30th Armoured; 1st Tank Brigade; 4th Armoured; 1st Assault Brigade Royal Engineers; 31st Tank; 34th Tank; 6th Guards Tank Brigade; 27th Armoured (to 9.1944); 33rd Armoured; 2nd Canadian Armoured Brigade; the headquarters of 74th, 76th, 80th, 100th, 101st, 105th, 106th and 107th Anti-Aircraft Brigades; numerous light anti-aircraft (LAA) and HAA regiments; and 56th Infantry Brigade, which joined 49th Division from 20 August 1944.

Canada

Free Belgian forces

Free Czechoslovak forces

Free Dutch forces

Free French forces & Fusiliers Marins

Free Norwegian forces
Approximately 1,950 Norwegian military personnel took part in the Normandy campaign in separate Norwegian units or as part of other Allied units in addition to 45 civilian ships with approximately 1,000 men from Nortraship. The Norwegian units operated under British command and were therefore primarily employed in the Gold, Sword and Juno sectors.

Some of the participating units:
 Air Force
 331 Squadron
 332 Squadron
 Navy
    S-class destroyer
   S-class destroyer
   Hunt-class destroyer
    Flower-class corvette
   Flower-class corvette
   Flower-class corvette
   fishery protection vessel
 Motor Launches No. 128, 213 and 573

Free Polish forces

See also
 Australian contribution to the Battle of Normandy

Notes

Citations

References
 Armed forces during the Battle of Normandy in 1944 D-Day Overlord
 
 
 
 
 OdB and history of units having taken part to the Falaise pocket battle at memorial-montormel.org(en/fr)
 Canadiansoldiers.com
 Regiments.org
 U.S. Army official site
 Maj-Gen Hubert Essame, The 43rd Wessex Division at War 1944–45, London: William Clowes, 1952. [NB: Personnel are given for whole North West Europe campaign].

World War II orders of battle

Allied